Chornobyl.3828, or Chernobyl.3828, is a 2011 Ukrainian documentary film about the Chernobyl disaster. Directed by Serhiy Zabolotnyi, it is dedicated to the "liquidators" who were involved in cleaning the most dangerous areas of the plant roof, the "M" zone. The film is named for the 3,828 people who worked in this area.

Plot

Twenty-five years have passed since Valeriy Starodumov worked as a dosimeter scout in September 1986. Valeriy worked at the epicenter of the explosion, the reactor's operation area, which was the most radioactive part of the site. The protagonist, a direct participant in the operation, went to the roof himself and brought people there after a failed attempt to clear the area with robots. At the government level, it was decided to assign soldiers and cadets of military schools to the task of cleaning the roofs. Unique pictures of the events of 1986 are widely used in the film. Chernobyl.3828 is dedicated to people who saved the world from the radioactive contamination at the cost of their health and life.

The film director Serhiy Zabolotnyi commented, "We all know what happened on April 26, 1986, but we know next to nothing about the events of the summer and autumn of 1986. Chernobyl.3828 is just one of many stories you need to know and remember."

Awards
 2012 — at the International Film Festival of Documentary Films "Film Chronicle" (Kyiv) the film Chernobyl 3828 won the Grand Prix.
 2017 — The Uranium Film Festival 2017 — Special Recognition for CHERNOBYL.3828

References

 Chernobyl.3828 at East Silver Market
 Chernobyl.3828 at Ukrainian Film Guide 
 Chernobyl.3828 at Official page Studios Telecon
 9 Eye-Opening Chernobyl Books & Documentaries, Recommended By The Series' Creator

External links
 

Ukrainian short documentary films
Documentary films about the Chernobyl disaster
2010s Russian-language films
Documentary films about environmental issues
2011 films
2011 short documentary films